The Germany women's national beach handball team is the national team of Germany. It is governed by the German Handball Association and takes part in international beach handball competitions.

International results

World Games
 3rd place (2004)
 2nd place (2001)
 Winner (2022)

World Championships
 2006 – 2nd place
 2022 – Winner

European Championship

 Winner (2006, 2021)
 2nd place (2001, 2007)
 3rd place (2004)

References

External links
Official website
IHF profile

Beach handball
Women's national beach handball teams
B